Lord Patrick James Herbert Crichton-Stuart (25 August 1794 – 7 September 1859), known as the Hon. Patrick Stuart until 1817, was a British politician.

Born Patrick Stuart, he was the second son of John Stuart, Lord Mount Stuart, eldest son of John Stuart, 1st Marquess of Bute, son of Prime Minister John Stuart, 3rd Earl of Bute. His mother was Lady Elizabeth Penelope, daughter and heiress of Patrick McDouall-Crichton, 6th Earl of Dumfries, while John Crichton-Stuart, 2nd Marquess of Bute, was his elder brother. His father was killed in a riding accident six months before he was born and his mother died when he was three. In 1817 he was granted the rank of a younger son of a marquess and assumed by Royal licence the surname of Crichton. The following year he was returned to Parliament for Cardiff, succeeding his uncle Lord Evelyn Stuart, a seat he held until 1820 and again from 1826 to 1832. Between 1847 and 1859 he also served as Lord-Lieutenant of Buteshire.

Crichton-Stuart married Hannah, daughter of William Tighe, MP, in 1818. Their son James also represented Cardiff in the House of Commons. Crichton-Stuart died in September 1859, aged 65. His wife survived him by thirteen years and died in June 1872.

References

External links 
 

1794 births
1859 deaths
Lord-Lieutenants of Buteshire
Members of the Parliament of the United Kingdom for Cardiff constituencies
UK MPs 1818–1820
UK MPs 1826–1830
UK MPs 1830–1831
UK MPs 1831–1832
Younger sons of marquesses
Patrick Stuart
Place of birth missing
Place of death missing
Members of the Parliament of the United Kingdom for Scottish constituencies
UK MPs 1832–1835
UK MPs 1835–1837
UK MPs 1837–1841
UK MPs 1841–1847
UK MPs 1847–1852
UK MPs 1852–1857
UK MPs 1857–1859
UK MPs 1859–1865